"Beth/Rest" is a song by Bon Iver. It is the closing track from the band's eponymous second album and was issued as the album's fourth and final single. The song was written by frontman Justin Vernon, who has stated that this is the song from the album that he is the proudest of.

On February 4, 2012, the band performed "Beth/Rest" on Saturday Night Live.

Critical reception
The song has polarized critics and listeners. Stephen Thompson of NPR called the song "the year's most divisive song", whereas Jillian Mapes of Billboard named the song as one of the best songs of 2011. Justin Vernon himself stated that he is "most proud" of the song when compared to the rest of the album, and that the song is his favorite song from the album.

Music video
The music video was directed by Vernon and Dan Huiting, who also directed the video for the album's lead single, "Calgary".

Track listing
All songs written by Justin Vernon.

 "Beth/Rest" – 5:16
 "Beth/Rest" (Rare Book Room) – 5:38

References

External links
 

2011 songs
2012 singles
4AD singles
Bon Iver songs
Jagjaguwar singles
Songs written by Justin Vernon